Marcus Di Giuseppe, also known as Bica, (born 12 March 1972) is a former Brazilian footballer.

Club career
Bica played for a number of clubs in Peru, including Sporting Cristal, Sport Boys and Universitario de Deportes. He also had a spell with Paniliakos in the Greek Super League during the 1997–98 season. He spent a few months playing in England for English Premier League side Sunderland A.F.C. and then First Division side Walsall at the end of 1999. His play was characterised by his swift and fluid running and incredible ball control skills. His powerful heading and his shooting from distance gave him the nickname "enerpoçinho" amongst his peers, fans and teammates. He's now a successful football player's agent from Overlap Soccer & Marketing company (www.overlapsoccer.com.br).

References

1972 births
Living people
Brazilian footballers
Sporting Cristal footballers
Sport Boys footballers
Club Universitario de Deportes footballers
Coronel Bolognesi footballers
FC Red Bull Salzburg players
Paniliakos F.C. players
Sunderland A.F.C. players
Walsall F.C. players
Danubio F.C. players
Expatriate footballers in Austria
Expatriate footballers in Greece
Expatriate footballers in England
Expatriate footballers in Peru
Expatriate footballers in Uruguay

Association football forwards
People from Registro